Louis Peter "Tony" Parisse (June 25, 1911 – June 2, 1956) was an American professional baseball player and manager. He appeared in ten Major League Baseball games as a catcher and pinch hitter for the –44 Philadelphia Athletics, one of the many players who received their only MLB trials during the World War II manpower shortage. During his six-season career in the minor leagues, he never played above the Class B level

Parisse, a Philadelphia native, didn't begin his professional career until he was almost 28 years old, in 1939. The Athletics summoned him from the Wilmington Blue Rocks in September 1943, and, in his second MLB game, Parisse collected two singles and an RBI in a 9–4 victory over the St. Louis Browns at Shibe Park on September 27. Those would represent two-thirds of his career hit total in the Majors, and his lone run batted in.

He briefly managed in the Chicago White Sox farm system (1947) before leaving the game, and died in Philadelphia three weeks before his 45th birthday.

References

External links

1911 births
1956 deaths
Allentown Dukes players
Baseball players from Philadelphia
Federalsburg A's players
Lancaster Red Roses players
Major League Baseball catchers
Minor league baseball managers
Philadelphia Athletics players
Wilmington Blue Rocks (1940–1952) players